Georgia Nathalie Lock (born 25 October 1996) is an English actress and presenter. She starred in the children's series Sadie J, The Evermoor Chronicles, and presented the CBBC magazine show Friday Download.

Early life and education
Lock was born in Aylesbury Vale and grew up in rural Buckinghamshire. She attended Waddesdon Church of England School. Her mother began taking her to drama classes in Winslow when she was eight.

Career

In 2010, Lock was cast as the main character in the CBBC television show Sadie J, which ran for three series from 2011 to 2013. In addition to playing the lead, she recorded the theme song, "In A Boy's World". The theme tune was officially released by Demon Records, in association with the BBC. A shortened version of the song is used for the Sadie J title sequence.

In 2011 she began presenting the CBBC entertainment programme Friday Download alongside Tyger Drew-Honey, Ceallach Spellman, Richard Wisker, Dionne Bromfield and Aidan Davis. She presented for 4 series from 2011 to 2012 before leaving the show.

In April 2014 it was announced that Lock had been cast as Bella in the Disney miniseries Evermoor alongside Naomi Sequeira, Jordan Loughran, George Sear and Georgie Farmer. In March 2015 it was announced that the miniseries had been given a full series order under the working title of The Evermoor Chronicles,  with Lock set to reprise her role as Bella.

In April 2015 it was announced that Lock would co-present Michel Roux Jr's upcoming Disney reality children's cooking competition First Class Chefs alongside Evermoor co-star Finney Cassidy.

In October 2020, Lock published a poetry book titled, With Every Wave.

Filmography

Film

Television

Web series

Discography

Singles

Awards and nominations

References

External links

Sadie J on the BBC website

Living people
1996 births
Actresses from Buckinghamshire
English television actresses
English television presenters
People from Aylesbury Vale
People with obsessive–compulsive disorder